Paul Anthony Broad (born 8 April 1951) is an Australian economist known for his management of government business departments.  In 2011 he was appointed as the Chief Executive Officer of Infrastructure NSW.  He is an advocate of user-pays pricing, and has a philosophical commitment to involving the private sector.

Early life
Moved from the Central Coast to the Newcastle area in 1964.

He attended high school at Hamilton Marist Brothers college.

He received Honours and master's degrees from Newcastle University in Economics.  His honours thesis was on the perils of price control in the milk industry.

Career
Broad began his career in the Federal Treasury in Canberra in 1974. In 1978 he returned to Newcastle to complete a Masters of Commerce (Economics).

1979 - Assistant director Industries Assistance Commission.

1993 - Hunter District Water Board as an economist....  move back to Newcastle.

1993 - Sydney Water

1997 - EnergyAustralia

2004 - Private business - Managing Director of PowerTel

2007 - Merger with AAPT - Was spokesman for industry opposition to the National Broadband Network, saying "We're having a massive income transfer from metro to the bush. Now that may be a good thing but don't hide it in the price."

2011 - Appointed Chief Executive Officer of  Infrastructure NSW ($500,000 salary - highest paid bureaucrat in NSW History)

As of 2011 Broad is a director of Kuth Energy.

2013 - Appointed Chief Executive of Snowy Hydro.

2019-20 - As CEO of Snowy Hydro Broad receives over $2 million in salary and bonuses.

2022 - Resigned as CEO of Snowy Hydro.

Personal life
Broad is married to Genevieve (his second wife) and they have two children. He is a keen surfer starting as a teenager and continuing into middle age.

Political positions
Broad is an advocate of user-pays pricing, and champions the power of the market.  This led to substantial pricing changes at Hunter Water and consequently demand dropped by 30 percent. When Chief Executive of Energy Australia, prices increased by 5.3% in 2004, which the opposition claimed would hit lower income families hard. He is also philosophically committed to involvement of the private sector, and in his role at the head of Infrastructure NSW has been reported supporting rail privatisation, congestion charges, and expanded tollways.

References 

Australian economists
University of Newcastle (Australia) alumni
Living people
1951 births
People from the Central Coast (New South Wales)
Sydney Water